The Troika is a  three-tower, luxury condominium development in Kuala Lumpur, Malaysia, located at the corner of Jalan Binjai and Persiaran KLCC, opposite PNB Darby Park, behind Menara Citibank and Intercontinental Hotel.

It was developed by Malaysian property developer, Bandar Raya Developments Berhad and designed by the British firm Foster and Partners.

Architecture

The Troika was completed in 2010, and features three glass-clad towers of varying heights. The three towers will surround a park located in the middle. The Troika also features two double-volume glass-encased bridges connecting a sky lobby which spans the three towers at the 24th floor.

Other components of The Troika development comprise small office home offices (SOHO), boutique offices, retail spaces and restaurants.

Awards 
Cityscape Best Developer Award 2008 
CNBC Asia Pacific Property Awards 2008 - 5 Star Best High Rise Residential and 5 Star Best Architectural

See also
List of tallest buildings in Kuala Lumpur

References

External links 
 The Troika official site
 The Troika at Bandar Raya Developments Berhad
 The Troika at the KLCC Condominiums Encyclopaedia

Skyscrapers in Kuala Lumpur
Buildings and structures completed in 2010
2010 establishments in Malaysia
Foster and Partners buildings
Residential skyscrapers in Malaysia